Hardly Strictly Bluegrass (HSB), originally Strictly Bluegrass, is an annual free and non-commercial music festival held the first weekend of October in Golden Gate Park in San Francisco, California. Conceived and subsidized by San Francisco venture capitalist Warren Hellman, the festival has been held every year since the first event in 2001.

From its outset, the festival has been subsidized by Hellman. Various corporations have offered to sponsor the event over the years, but Hellman always turned them down, saying in an interview, "I want to keep it entirely free and noncommercial". For some performers, the unique fact that the event is unsponsored is very important to character.  In an interview with Hellman, Ketch Secor of Old Crow Medicine Show said that part of what keeps the event focused on the music and the community is Warren's decision to ensure it is not "consumption driven" and the audience is not "bombarded with signage".

Originally Hellman intended only to invite bluegrass musicians.  But soon artists from other genres were invited to the event, and in 2004 the word "Hardly" was added to reflect its expanded scope. The festival draws very large crowds, nearly equal in number to the entire population of San Francisco.  In 2011, the festival drew an estimated 750,000 people over the course of the three-day event.

History
Hellman first mentioned his dream of holding a festival for bluegrass music in the park to Jonathan Nelson in 2001.  Nelson had worked for Bill Graham Presents, and introduced Hellman to booking agent and executive producer Dawn Holliday, and production manager Sheri Sternberg at a lunch. Holliday and Sternberg agreed to help and would continue to produce the festival, respectively, each year thereafter.

From the start, Hellman most wanted Hazel Dickens to perform at the festival.  But Dickens, who was known for political songs about workers' strikes, was wary of performing because of Hellman's wealth and background.  She later agreed, and went on to perform at the festival every year from 2001 until her death in April 2011. The 2011 festival was dedicated to the memory of Dickens, a personal friend of Hellman, who died five months earlier.

The festival name and scope was changed when, at the very first festival in 2001,  Emmylou Harris played with her not strictly bluegrass band.  Hellman was a fan of her bluegrass sound under the band name Nash Ramblers, but at the time she was touring as Spyboy.  She played the festival as Spyboy, which had a New Orleans style rhythm section. Hellman did not complain, and "Hardly" was eventually added to the name of the festival in 2004. Before her set in 2009, Emmylou Harris was awarded an honorary doctorate from Berklee College of Music by the president of the college.

Coronavirus pandemic response 
For the 2020 show, Hardly Strictly Bluegrass, in response to the Coronavirus disease 2019, went digital and streamed a series of prerecorded performances. Additionally, HSB worked with Artist Relief to administer $1 million in relief aid to musicians.

Performing artists
The most frequent performers over the years, each with five or more appearances, have been:
 Emmylou Harris
 Dry Branch Fire Squad
 Hazel Dickens
 Robert Earl Keen
 Gillian Welch
 Kevin Welch & Kieran Kane & Fats Kaplin
 The Del McCoury Band
 Earl Scruggs
 Guy Clark & Verlon Thompson
 Ricky Skaggs & Kentucky Thunder
 Peter Rowan
 Buddy Miller
 Alison Brown
 Dale Ann Bradley & Coon Creek
 Laurie Lewis & The Right Hands
 Moonalice
 Ralph Stanley & The Clinch Mountain Boys
 Jimmie Dale Gilmore
 Nick Lowe
 Poor Man's Whiskey
 Steve Earle & The Dukes
 The Wronglers
 Conor Oberst
 Justin Townes Earle
 T-Bone Burnett

See also

List of bluegrass music festivals
List of country music festivals

References

External links

 Hardly Strictly Bluegrass official website

Folk festivals in the United States
Bluegrass festivals
Culture of San Francisco
Music festivals in California
Festivals in the San Francisco Bay Area
Music of the San Francisco Bay Area
2001 establishments in the United States
Golden Gate Park
Music festivals established in 2001